Marcel Schneider (born 6 February 1990) is a German professional golfer who plays on the European Tour and the Challenge Tour. He has won three times on the Challenge Tour, the 2018 Swiss Challenge and the 2021 Kaskáda Golf Challenge and Open de Portugal.

Amateur career
Schneider had a successful year in 2012. At the start of the year, he won the Australian Amateur beating Daniel Nisbet at the 37th hole in the final. During the year he played in the Bonallack Trophy and the St Andrews Trophy and he was part of the German team that took a joint bronze medal in the Eisenhower Trophy in Turkey. He turned professional at the end of 2012.

Professional career
Schneider played on the Pro Golf Tour in 2013 and 2014. 2014 was a successful year with two victories and he led the Order of Merit. That gave him entry to the Second Stage of the European Tour Qualifying School.  He then finished 73rd in the final stage, to earn a place on the Challenge Tour.

From 2015 to 2020 Schneider mostly played on the Challenge Tour. In 2015 he was joint runner-up in the Gant Open in Finland. In 2018 he won the Swiss Challenge and was runner-up in the Rolex Trophy. In 2020 he was runner-up in the Austrian Open and lost in a playoff for the Italian Challenge Open Eneos Motor Oil. He finished second in the 2020 Challenge Tour Order of Merit to gain limited playing opportunities on the 2021 European Tour. In July 2021, playing in his first Challenge Tour event of the season, he had his second success on the tour, winning the Kaskáda Golf Challenge by one stroke. The win also gave him an entry into the 2021 Open Championship, his first major championship.

Amateur wins
2009 Austrian Amateur
2012 Australian Amateur

Professional wins (5)

Challenge Tour wins (3)

Challenge Tour playoff record (0–2)

Pro Golf Tour wins (2)

Results in major championships

CUT = missed the half-way cut

Team appearances
Amateur
European Boys' Team Championship (representing Germany): 2007
Bonallack Trophy (representing Europe): 2012 (winners)
St Andrews Trophy (representing the Continent of Europe): 2012 (winners)
European Amateur Team Championship (representing Germany): 2011
Eisenhower Trophy (representing Germany): 2012

See also
2017 European Tour Qualifying School graduates
2021 Challenge Tour graduates

References

External links
 
 
 
 

German male golfers
European Tour golfers
People from Bietigheim-Bissingen
Sportspeople from Stuttgart (region)
1990 births
Living people